The Indian locomotive class WT was a class of  heavy tank locomotives used on  broad gauge lines in India from 1960. These locomotives were built to operate local trains in Eastern Railways zone on Howrah to Burdwan main line.

The thirty members of the WT class were designed in India, and built by Chittaranjan Locomotive Works, Chittaranjan, in Burdwan District, West Bengal, India.

See also

Rail transport in India#History
Indian Railways
Locomotives of India
Rail transport in India

References

Notes

Bibliography

Chittaranjan Locomotive Works locomotives
Railway locomotives introduced in 1960
WT
2-8-4T locomotives
5 ft 6 in gauge locomotives
Scrapped locomotives